The Saturn Award for Best Independent Film is an award presented to by the Academy of Science Fiction, Fantasy & Horror Films.

Winners and nominees

2010s

2020s

External links
Official Site

References

Saturn award
Independent Film
Awards established in 2012